Expiration is an independent feature film, directed by Gavin Heffernan and released in 2003. The film stars Heffernan as Sam, a man who unwittingly walks in on a convenience store robbery in Montreal and must team up with drug dealer Rachel (Janet Lane) in an attempt to recover their stolen goods.

It was the winner of the Grand Jury Prize and Best Feature Film at the 2004 Canadian Filmmakers' Festival.

References

External links

2003 films
English-language Canadian films
Canadian crime drama films
Films shot in Montreal
Films set in Montreal
2000s English-language films
2000s Canadian films